Miko is a given name found in several cultures. It can be a Japanese female name. It can be an eastern European name, with origins in Slovakia, sometimes short for Mikolaj. Miko can also be a variant of the name Michael, which has Hebrew origins. 

The name Miko may refer to:

Miko Doyle (1911–1980), Irish sportsman
Miko Golubovic (born 1982), Montenegrin basketball player 
Miko Hughes (born 1986), American actor
Miko Lim (born 1980), American photographer
Miko Mälberg (born 1985), Estonian swimmer
Miko Marks, American singer-songwriter
Miko Mayama (born 1939), Japanese-American actress 
Miko Mission (born 1945), Italian musician
Miko Peled (born 1961), Israeli political activist
Miko Rwayitare (1942–2007), Rwandan businessman
Miko Sotto (1982–2003), Filipino actor
Miko Tavares (born 1981), Cape Verdean football player
Miko Tripalo (1926–1995), Croatian politician
Miko Weaver (born 1957), American guitarist

See also

Mika
Mikko
Miko (disambiguation)
Mito (name)

Given names